Robert John Thompson (8 March 1947 – 18 November 2018) was a rugby union player who represented Australia.

Thompson, a hooker, was born in Rotorua and claimed a total of three international rugby caps for Australia, two against South Africa, one against France.

References

Australian rugby union players
Australia international rugby union players
1947 births
2018 deaths
Rugby union players from Rotorua
New Zealand emigrants to Australia
Rugby union hookers
Rugby union players from the Bay of Plenty Region